In mathematics, a  projectionless C*-algebra is a C*-algebra with no nontrivial projections. For a unital C*-algebra, the projections 0 and 1 are trivial. While for a non-unital C*-algebra, only 0 is considered trivial. The problem of whether simple infinite-dimensional C*-algebras with this property exist was posed in 1958 by Irving Kaplansky, and the first example of one was published in 1981 by Bruce Blackadar. For commutative C*-algebras, being projectionless is equivalent to its spectrum being connected. Due to this, being projectionless can be considered as a noncommutative analogue of a connected space.

Examples 
 C, the algebra of complex numbers.
 The reduced group C*-algebra of the free group on finitely many generators.
 The Jiang-Su algebra is simple, projectionless, and KK-equivalent to C.

Dimension drop algebras 
Let  be the class consisting of the C*-algebras  for each , and let  be the class of all C*-algebras of the form

,

References

C*-algebras